Dino Ramić (born December 31, 1988) is an American soccer player who last played for Highlands Park F.C. of the South African National First Division. He was known for his speed, footwork and goalscoring ability during his time at Clarke University, playing a key role in the team's success.

Early life
Beginning football when he was 3, Ramić immigrated with his family aged 8 to the United States in 1997 due to the Bosnian War, a conflict that had lasting reverberations around the area.

Career

South Africa
Wearing South African National First Division competitors Highlands Park F.C.'s colors in 2015–16, Ramic tallied nine appearances there, scoring a header when his team beat African Warriors 3-0 and getting a brace in another 3–0 victory, this time over Thanda Royal Zulu. The forward started training with Highlands Park in late 2014, with the club waiting for his work permit.

Personal life
Ramić was born on December 31, 1988, in Mostar, SR Bosnia and Herzegovina to Hajrudin and Sabina Ramić and has one sister, Arna Ramić. With his grandfather and father having professional football experience in Bosnia, Ramić's mother's cousin is former footballer and current sporting director of FC Bayern Munich Hasan Salihamidžić.

Honors

High school
Hanford High School Rookie of the Year(1)
Hanford High School Golden Boot Award(2)
first-team All-Mid-Valley Conference(2)
State team class 3A(1)

College
MCC Newcomer of the Year(1): 2008
Most game-winning goals (5) and shots per game (3.61) in college soccer history- 2010
MCC All-Conference Honorable Mention(1): 2010
MCC Offensive Player of the Week(2): 2011
NAIA All-American Honorable Mention(1): 2011
MCC first-team All-Conference(1): 2008, 2011, 2012
Most goals scored in Clarke college soccer career

References

External links
 at Soccerway

American expatriate soccer players
American soccer players
Association football forwards
Living people
1988 births
Highlands Park F.C. players
Expatriate soccer players in South Africa
Sportspeople from Mostar
American people of Bosniak descent